Music video award or Video music award may refer to:

Channel O Music Video Awards, Pan-African music awards organised by South Africa-based Channel O
Grammy Award for Best Music Video, presented by the National Academy of Recording Arts and Sciences, United States
iHeartRadio Much Music Video Awards (MMVAs), presented by the Canadian television channel Much
MAD Video Music Awards, an annual awards show on MAD TV, Greece
Mnet Asian Music Award for Best Music Video Award, presented annually by CJ E&M Pictures
MTV Video Music Awards, presented by the cable channel MTV
Soul Train Music Award for Best Video of the Year, produced by the television show Soul Train 
Space Shower Music Video Awards, sponsored by Space Shower TV, Japan
UK Music Video Awards, organized by BFI Southbank